Mario Rosario Morelli (born 15 May 1941) is an Italian judge. He was Judge of the Constitutional Court of Italy between 12 December 2011 and 12 December 2020, and served as its president from 16 September 2020.

Career
Morelli was born in Rome on 15 May 1941. He is the father of actor Giampaolo Morelli, who was born in 1974. He was a President of Section of the Court of Cassation before being appointed to the Constitutional Court by the Court of Cassation on 18 November 2011. He was sworn in on 12 December 2011.

When Giorgio Lattanzi became President of the Court on 8 March 2018, he named Morelli Vice President. He was confirmed in this position by President Marta Cartabia on 11 December 2019. On 16 September 2020 Morelli became president, he was elected in the second round of voting with nine votes, while Giancarlo Coraggio obtained five and Giuliano Amato received one. As first act in office he made both Coraggio and Amato Vice President. His term in office ended on 12 December 2020.

References

1941 births
Living people
Judges of the Constitutional Court of Italy
Judges from Rome
Presidents of the Constitutional Court of Italy
Vice Presidents of the Constitutional Court of Italy